Laurent Cadu (born 22 August 1966) is a former professional footballer. He played as a defender and is currently the scout of La Berrichonne de Châteauroux.

External links
Laurent Cadu career stats at chamoisfc79.fr

1966 births
Living people
French footballers
Association football defenders
Chamois Niortais F.C. players
Ligue 1 players
Ligue 2 players
Thouars Foot 79 players